The Dabur class is a class of patrol boats built at the Sewart Seacraft (now Swiftships) shipyard in the United States for the Israeli Navy. These naval vessels are also built by IAI-Ramta.

Design
The ships are crewed by a complement of six to eight officers and ratings. The hull is made of aluminum.

The first Dabur-class vessels were laid down in 1970, with 12 hulls built by Swiftships in Morgan City Louisiana and 22 more built by IAI-Ramta for a total of 34. The class is designed to be light and is able to be carried overland. They have good rough weather capability, however they were not considered fast enough to cope with current threat capabilities and were phased out in the Israeli Navy for newer ships.

Propulsion
The class is powered by two diesel General Motors type 12V71TN creating  driving two shafts.

Armament
The boats are armed with two Oerlikon 20 mm cannons, two 12.7 mm machine guns. Two  torpedo tubes are provided for the Mark 46 torpedo and there is space for two racks of depth charges. Carl Gustav recoilless rifles are carried aboard the ships for anti-terrorist purposes.

Exports
In 1976, five of the class were given to the Christian Lebanese Forces Militia in Lebanon, but they were later returned in 1990. In 1978 Israel sold four of the class to Argentina and four to Nicaragua. In 1984 they sold two to Sri Lanka. In 1991 four more were sold to Fiji and six to Chile. Chile bought four more in 1995, and Nicaragua purchased three more in 1996.

Service history
Dabur-class boats first battle engagements were made in the October 1973 Yom Kippur War. During the war, two Dabur boats attacked an Egyptian commando force in its own port at Marse Talamat and destroyed speed boats and rubber dinghies just as they were preparing for attacks on Israeli targets in the Sinai Peninsula.

Operators

 (4 units)
 (3 units)
 (4 units)
RFNS 301 Vai (1991)
RFNS 302 Ogo (1991)
RFNS 303 Saku (1991)
RFNS 304 Saqa (1991)
 (2 units)

 (8 to 10 units)

Former operators
 (decommissioned)
 Lebanese Forces: 5 units, returned to Israel after October 1990.

Notes

References

Secondary sources
 Alain Menargues, Les Secrets de la guerre du Liban: Du coup d'état de Béchir Gémayel aux massacres des camps palestiniens, Albin Michel, Paris 2004.  (in French)
 Claire Hoy and Victor Ostrovsky, By Way of Deception: The Making and Unmaking of a Mossad Officer, St. Martin’s Press, New York 1990.

External links 

Naval ships of Israel
Patrol boat classes